The Marib – Ras Isa oil pipeline (also known as Marib pipeline) is the main oil pipeline in Yemen. It runs from the Ma'rib oil refinery to FSO Safer, an offshore storage and offloading facility, offshore from As-Salif.

Feasibility study of the pipeline was conducted in 1985. Construction started in September 1986 and the pipeline was commissioned in 1987.  The pipeline was sabotaged during the instability in 2011 and was shut in October 2011. The reparation works were concluded on 15 July 2012.

The pipeline and terminal are operated by the SAFER Exploration & Production Operations Company.

References

Oil pipelines in Yemen